Sven Riederer (born 27 March 1981) is an athlete from Switzerland, who competes in triathlon. Riederer competed at the second Olympic triathlon at the 2004 Summer Olympics.  He won the bronze medal with a time of 1:51:33.26, 25.5 seconds behind the leader after the nearly two-hour race.

References 
 http://www.svenriederer.ch

1981 births
Living people
Swiss male triathletes
Olympic bronze medalists for Switzerland
Olympic triathletes of Switzerland
Triathletes at the 2004 Summer Olympics
Triathletes at the 2008 Summer Olympics
Triathletes at the 2012 Summer Olympics
Triathletes at the 2016 Summer Olympics
Olympic medalists in triathlon
Medalists at the 2004 Summer Olympics
20th-century Swiss people
21st-century Swiss people